"On the Radio" is the first single from Regina Spektor's fourth album, Begin to Hope. The chorus contains references to the song "November Rain" by Guns N' Roses. As of 2009 the single had sold 116,000 copies in United States.

Music video
An accompanying music video was released which shows Spektor teaching a music class made up of young school children. The video uses stop motion in a few scenes. An alternate video was released in which Spektor sings in a chocolate factory. The video was directed by Matt Lenski.

In popular culture
The television show Grey's Anatomy used the song "On The Radio" in the episode "Damage Case". 

"On The Radio" was featured in the 2011 film Beastly. It was also used in the soundtrack of the French movie Bouquet final (2008) directed by Michel Delgado. It can also be heard in the soundtrack of the French movie The Day I Saw Your Heart (2011 - American title), directed by Romain Lévy, Cécile Sellam and Jennifer Devoldère. 

Amanda Palmer has performed this song often live from her and Spektor's similar, piano-driven styles. 

The Netflix series Sex Education used a cover by Chip Taylor in the final episode of the second season.

Release history

* Taken from the Live at Bull Moose EP

Charts

References

External links
 On The Radio video, on MySpaceTV

2006 singles
Regina Spektor songs
Sire Records singles
Songs about radio
Music videos directed by Matt Lenski
Song recordings produced by David Kahne
Songs written by Regina Spektor